Igor Pugaci (born 5 January 1975 in Dubăsari) is a retired  a Moldovan road bicycle racer.

Major results

1998
 1st, Overall, Giro della Valle d'Aosta (U23)

1999
National Road Championships
1st  Time trial
1st  Road race

2000
 1st  Time trial, National Road Championships

2001
 1st  Time trial, National Road Championships

2006
1st, Stage 3, Tour of Turkey

External links

Moldovan male cyclists
1975 births
Living people
Olympic cyclists of Moldova
Cyclists at the 1996 Summer Olympics
Cyclists at the 2004 Summer Olympics
People from Dubăsari